Kirsten Dunst began her career as a child actress, appearing in small roles in Woody Allen's New York Stories (1989) and Brian De Palma's The Bonfire of the Vanities (1990). At age 12, she garnered widespread recognition for her portrayal of Claudia in the 1994 film adaptation of Interview with the Vampire, which earned her various critical accolades, including a Golden Globe nomination for Best Supporting Actress. Also in 1994, she portrayed young Amy March in the film adaptation of Little Women. She subsequently had roles in the youth fantasy films Jumanji (1995) and Small Soldiers (1998).

In the late 1990s, Dunst transitioned to leading roles in teen films, such as the satirical political comedy Dick, and the Sofia Coppola-directed drama The Virgin Suicides (both released in 1999), followed by the cheerleading comedy Bring It On (2000), and the drama Crazy/Beautiful (2001). She subsequently portrayed Marion Davies in Peter Bogdanovich's period drama The Cat's Meow (2001). Dunst gained a resurgence of mainstream attention for her role as Mary Jane Watson in Sam Raimi's Spider-Man (2002), a role which she reprised for the following two sequels. She had a minor part in Michel Gondry's psychological drama Eternal Sunshine of the Spotless Mind (2004), followed by a lead in Cameron Crowe's tragicomedy film Elizabethtown (2005), and as the title character in Coppola's Marie Antoinette (2006). In 2010, Dunst portrayed Katherine Marks, the missing wife of accused murderer Robert Durst, in the biographical crime film All Good Things (2010).

In 2011, Dunst starred in Lars von Trier's sci-fi drama Melancholia portraying a depressed newlywed, which earned her numerous accolades, including the Cannes Film Festival Award for Best Actress. She then had a supporting role in On the Road (2012), an adaptation of the Jack Kerouac novel, and appeared in the thriller The Two Faces of January (2014). In 2015, Dunst was cast as Peggy Blumquist in the second season of the FX series Fargo, which earned her multiple accolades, including a second Golden Globe nomination, this time in the category of Best Actress in a Series. She followed this with a supporting role in the biographical drama Hidden Figures (2016), and reunited again with Coppola for her remake of The Beguiled (2017). Dunst returned to television with a lead role in the black comedy series On Becoming a God in Central Florida, which she also executive-produced.

Film

Television

Video games

Music videos

See also
List of awards and nominations received by Kirsten Dunst

References

External links

Actress filmographies
American filmographies